Dolly Meléndez (born April 16, 1984) is a retired Puerto Rican female volleyball that played with the Puerto Rican national team.

She was part of the Puerto Rico women's national volleyball team at the 2002 FIVB Volleyball Women's World Championship in Germany, She played for Criollas de Caguas, winning the 2002 league championship.

Clubs
  Criollas de Caguas (2002-2006)

References

External links 

1984 births
Living people
Puerto Rican women's volleyball players
Place of birth missing (living people)